"Two Hearts Beat as One" is a song by Irish rock band U2. It is the seventh track on their 1983 album, War, and was released as its second single in the United States, United Kingdom, and Australia on 21 March 1983.

History
The music video was directed by Meiert Avis and was filmed outside the Basilica of Sacré Coeur de Montmartre in Paris in March 1983 and portrays the band performing the song, intercut with scenes of an acrobat and other scenes featuring Peter Rowen (the boy who appears on the album cover). The Parisian church is dedicated to the Sacred Heart of Jesus. Unlike the other videos from the album, it has never been included on any of the band's video compilations.

It was released as the album's second single in the US, UK and Australia, as opposed to "Sunday Bloody Sunday", which was released only in the mainland of Europe. Both singles were released in Japan.

"Two Hearts Beat as One" features a bassline by Adam Clayton which is played at the beginning of the song.

The isolated bassline is the main rhythm on Martin Solveig's 2003 Exotic Disco mix of "Madan", a song originally by Salif Keita.

Reception
Cash Box praised the intensity produced by the "pounding bass figures, snap drumming and Bono’s voice."

Live performances
The song was first played in concert on 26 February 1983, at the first show of the War Tour and was played at almost all concerts on that tour. On the second leg of the War Tour, "Two Hearts Beat as One" began to follow "Surrender" and the two songs segued together. This transition survived to the Unforgettable Fire Tour. However, on the third leg of the Unforgettable Fire Tour, "Two Hearts Beat as One" was separated from "Surrender" and it was played less frequently. Its last tour appearance on 29 April 1985, in Atlanta. It made a further subsequent appearance when it was performed as part of the encore at a Lovetown Tour concert on 27 December 1989, in the Point Depot, Dublin. The song was not played live again for 25 years until a New York concert during the Innocence + Experience Tour.

A live performance of the song at Red Rocks Amphitheatre appears on the DVD release of the concert film Live at Red Rocks: Under a Blood Red Sky.

Formats and track listings

Charts

See also
List of covers of U2 songs – Two Hearts Beat as One

References

1983 singles
1983 songs
Island Records singles
Music videos directed by Meiert Avis
Songs written by Adam Clayton
Songs written by Bono
Songs written by the Edge
Songs written by Larry Mullen Jr.
Song recordings produced by Steve Lillywhite
U2 songs